The Grand Mufti of Saudi Arabia is the most senior and most influential Muslim religious and legal authority in Saudi Arabia. The holder of the position is appointed by the King. The Grand Mufti is the head of the Permanent Committee for Islamic Research and Issuing Fatwas.

Role
The Grand Mufti is the most senior religious authority in the country. His main role is to give opinions (fatwas) on legal matters and on social affairs. The Saudi court system is heavily influenced by the opinions of the Grand Mufti.

History
The office was created in 1953 by King Abdul Aziz with the appointment of Muhammad ibn Ibrahim Al ash-Sheikh. Usually, the office of the Grand Mufti has been filled by a member of the Al ash-Sheikh (the descendants of Muhammad ibn Abd al-Wahhab)  In fact, there has only ever been one Grand Mufti of Saudi Arabia who was not an Al ash-Sheikh. In 1969, King Faisal abolished the office of Grand Mufti and replaced it with a Ministry of Justice. The position was restored in 1993 with the appointment of Abdul Aziz bin Abdullah bin Baz. The current mufti Abdul-Aziz ibn Abdullah Al Sheikh was appointed in 1999 by King Fahd after the death of Ibn Baz.

List of incumbents
 Muhammad ibn Ibrahim Al ash-Sheikh 1953–1969
 Position abolished 1969–1993
 Abdul Aziz bin Abdullah bin Baz 1993–1999
 Abdul-Aziz ibn Abdullah Al ash-Sheikh 1999–present

See also

Grand Mufti
Mufti
Legal system of Saudi Arabia

References

Religious leadership roles
 
Lists of Islamic religious leaders